Rowland is a town in Rowland Township, Robeson County, North Carolina, United States. The population was 1,037 at the 2010 census.

History
The congregation of the Ashpole Presbyterian Church was founded in the eventual bounds of the community in 1796. Rowland was incorporated in 1889 and named in honor of Alfred Rowland. The first brick building in the town, a hotel and store, was erected in 1892. Rowland served as a key market for regional tobacco production until the sector declined in the 1970s. By the mid-2000s the downtown was in physical decline, though by 2015 work had been done to clean up the main thoroughfare and maintain its buildings. The Ashpole Presbyterian Church, Centenary Methodist Church, Rowland Depot, and Rowland Main Street Historic District are listed on the National Register of Historic Places.

Geography
Rowland is located at  (34.535357, -79.292548).

On Interstate 95, it is one exit north of a roadside attraction called South of the Border.

Demographics

2020 census

As of the 2020 United States census, there were 885 people, 441 households, and 244 families residing in the town.

2010 census
As of the 2010 United States Census, there were 1,037 people living in the town. The racial makeup of the town was 70.2% Black, 20.7% White, 5.8% Native American and 1.6% from two or more races. 1.6% were Hispanic or Latino of any race.

2000 census
As of the census of 2000, there were 1,146 people, 487 households, and 302 families living in the town. The population density was 1,079.8 people per square mile (417.4/km). There were 542 housing units at an average density of 510.7 per square mile (197.4/km). The racial makeup of the town was 26.70% White, 67.98% African American, 4.45% Native American, 0.17% from other races, and 0.70% from two or more races. Hispanic or Latino of any race were 0.35% of the population.

There were 487 households, out of which 25.7% had children under the age of 18 living with them, 31.8% were married couples living together, 25.9% had a female householder with no husband present, and 37.8% were non-families. 35.9% of all households were made up of individuals, and 20.1% had someone living alone who was 65 years of age or older. The average household size was 2.35 and the average family size was 3.05.

In the town, the population was spread out, with 26.4% under the age of 18, 6.9% from 18 to 24, 25.0% from 25 to 44, 23.3% from 45 to 64, and 18.4% who were 65 years of age or older. The median age was 38 years. For every 100 females, there were 80.5 males. For every 100 females age 18 and over, there were 69.8 males.

The median income for a household in the town was $18,021, and the median income for a family was $27,679. Males had a median income of $23,571 versus $20,125 for females. The per capita income for the town was $14,411. About 23.1% of families and 31.3% of the population were below the poverty line, including 44.9% of those under age 18 and 35.3% of those age 65 or over.

References

Works cited
 
 

Towns in Robeson County, North Carolina
Towns in North Carolina